Baker County is the name of three counties in the US:

Baker County, Florida
Baker County, Georgia
Baker County, Oregon